White Swan Park was a small amusement park on the border of Moon and Findlay townships in Allegheny County near Pittsburgh that operated from 1955 to 1989.  It was located on the Penn-Lincoln Parkway West (then PA 60) at McClaren Road, just 1½ miles south of the old Greater Pittsburgh International Airport site.

History 
The park opened in 1955 with seven rides. It was operated by brother and sister Roy Todd and Margaret Kleeman, who built it along with Kleeman's husband Edward.

White Swan also had a pavilion of midway games (which was the actual entrance to the park), six picnic shelters, a Skee Ball building, and a refreshment stand.  On July 12, 1963, a new miniature golf course opened at the east end of the park.

With construction of the new Pittsburgh International Airport underway in the late 1980s, a reroute of PA 60 (renumbered I-376 in 2009) was needed for access.  After the park's 1989 season, Pennsylvania Department of Transportation bought the park.  Dismantling of the park began the following year.  The amusements and other artifacts were sold at auction. The Mad Mouse was moved to Lakemont Park in Altoona, Pennsylvania, but was sold and removed in 2003.  The Galaxi coaster was shipped to Joyland Amusement Park in Lubbock, Texas where it still operates today. The last item from the park to be removed was the Giant Slide. The Tilt-a-Whirl is still in operation at Knoebels Amusement Resort in Elysburg, PA.

The small park was appropriate primarily for families with young children, and was seen by many in its area as easier to visit on a whim than the larger Kennywood amusement park, which dominates the Pittsburgh market.

List of attractions

Main park rides
Ferris Wheel, Galaxi (roller coaster), Giant Slide, Mad Mouse (roller coaster), Scrambler, Sports Skooter, Tilt-A-Whirl

Kiddieland rides
Airplanes, Carousel, Handcars, Helicopters, Train, Locomotive

References

External links 

 

Defunct amusement parks in Pennsylvania
1955 establishments in Pennsylvania
1989 disestablishments in Pennsylvania
Amusement parks in Pennsylvania
Amusement parks opened in 1955
Amusement parks closed in 1989